"Coming to Homerica" is the twenty-first and final episode of the twentieth season of the American animated television series The Simpsons. It originally aired on the Fox network in the United States on May 17, 2009. The episode title is a parody of the 1988 film Coming to America. The storyline is a pick on illegal immigration to the United States, complete with self-appointed vigilantes and building a fence to prevent it. Tying in with the episode's subject of Norwegian-descended settlers, its first US broadcast coincided with the Norwegian Constitution Day.

Plot
Krusty the Clown is informed that his Krusty Burger restaurants serve the unhealthiest fast food in the world, so he decides to add a vegetarian sandwich to the menu. It proves instantly popular throughout Springfield, but much of the town soon contracts food poisoning, which is traced to a load of tainted barley that was grown in the neighboring town of Ogdenville and used at Krusty Burger. The barley industry in Ogdenville collapses as a result, and many residents (descended from the town's original Norwegian settlers) are forced to abandon their homes and move to Springfield in search of work.

The residents of Springfield are initially hospitable and hire the Ogdenvillians as day laborers. However, after Bart injures himself in a collision with a bus while showing off skateboard tricks, Homer and Marge rush him to the hospital only to find a waiting time in excess of three hours due to so many Ogdenvillians seeking medical care. Homer visits Moe's Tavern, which is now filled with Ogdenvillians, and finds that Moe has begun serving akvavit. Unaware of its high alcohol content, Homer drinks a full mug and instantly becomes intoxicated. The next morning, Mr. Burns fires him for showing up to work late and drunk.

Responding to the town's growing resentment, Mayor Joe Quimby declares at a town meeting that Springfield will close its borders to immigrants from Ogdenville. Chief Wiggum and fellow officer Lou are too lazy to control the border themselves, so they distribute guns and beer to a group of vigilantes, among them Homer, Lenny and Carl. After several failed attempts to keep Ogdenvillians out of Springfield, the vigilantes decide to build a wall. The residents of Springfield hire workers from Ogdenville to assist with the construction of the wall since they cannot build it themselves. As the building progresses, the residents of both communities discover that their similarities outweigh their differences. Once the wall is complete, the residents of Springfield realize that they miss their neighbors, so the Ogdenvillians return through a door they built in the wall. The police arrive with music to start a party for all the people there, and the episode closes with a picture of the Norwegian flag.

Reception
This episode was seen by 5.86 million viewers.

Robert Canning of IGN gave the episode a positive review, saying that "shaky ending aside, the story unfolded well and the episode was full of funny bits." He went on to say, "funny, smart and, well, funny, "Coming To Homerica" was a great way to end a generally positive season."

Mac McEntire of TV Verdict.com gave it a mixed review, saying that "another season of The Simpsons comes to a close, with an up-and-down episode." He went on to say, "the first half of the episode is much stronger in laughs and content than the second half, especially the somewhat rushed ending".

References

External links 
 

The Simpsons (season 20) episodes
2009 American television episodes
Television episodes about immigration